Dannebrog (until the mid-20th century often spelled Danebrog) may refer to:

Flags and orders 
 The national Flag of Denmark
 Order of the Dannebrog, a Royal Danish decoration

Places 
 Dannebrog Island, an island in Greenland
 Dannebrog Islands, an island group in Antarctica
 Dannebrog, Nebraska, a village in Nebraska, United States

Ships 
 Danish ironclad Dannebrog, a frigate of the Royal Danish Navy, also known as the HDMS Dannebrog (1850)
 HDMS Dannebroge (1692) (The name is spelled Dannebrog in some references)
 HDMY Dannebrog (1879), the first royal Danish side-wheel paddle steam-yacht, named after the flag
 HDMY Dannebrog (A540), a Danish royal yacht, named after the flag